Minnesota State Highway 76 (MN 76) is a highway in southeast Minnesota, which runs from Iowa Highway 76 at the Iowa state line (near Eitzen), and continues north to its northern terminus at its interchange with Interstate Highway 90 in Pleasant Hill Township near Winona.

Route description
Highway 76 serves as a north–south route in southeast Minnesota between Caledonia, Houston, and Interstate 90.

The route passes through the Richard J. Dorer State Forest.

Beaver Creek Valley State Park is located 4 miles west of the junction of Highway 76 and Houston County Road 1 at Caledonia.  The park entrance is located on County Road 1.

Highway 76 parallels State Highway 26 and State Highway 43 throughout its route.

The route is legally defined as Legislative Route 76 in the Minnesota Statutes.

History
Highway 76 was authorized in 1933.

By 1953, only the section in Houston County was paved. All of Highway 76 was paved by 1963.

Major intersections

References

076
Transportation in Houston County, Minnesota
Transportation in Winona County, Minnesota